Eddy Wilson II (born February 13, 1997) is currently a free Agent. He played college football at Purdue.

Early years
Wilson attended West Bloomfield High School in West Bloomfield, Michigan. As a senior, he tallied 72 tackles with 19 sacks. He originally committed to play football for the Bowling Green Falcons but changed his commitment to the Purdue Boilermakers.

College career
Wilson played in nine games in 2015 as a true freshman, recording ten tackles.

In 2016, as a sophomore, Wilson played in ten games, tallying 36 tackles (six for loss) and 2.5 sacks.

As a junior in 2017 Wilson played in 12 of Purdue's 13 games, missing only the 2017 Foster Farms Bowl. In 12 games, he made 27 tackles (2.5 for loss), one sack and two pass breakups. After the season, he declared for the 2018 NFL Draft.

Professional career

Seattle Seahawks
Wilson signed with the Seattle Seahawks as an undrafted free agent on May 4, 2018. He was waived on August 3, 2018.

Cincinnati Bengals
On August 4, 2018, Wilson was claimed off waivers by the Cincinnati Bengals. He was waived on September 1, 2018.

Salt Lake Stallions
In 2018, Wilson joined the Salt Lake Stallions of the Alliance of American Football. He was waived on February 27, 2019.

References

External links
Purdue bio

1997 births
Living people
Sportspeople from Pontiac, Michigan
Players of American football from Michigan
American football defensive tackles
Purdue Boilermakers football players
Seattle Seahawks players
Cincinnati Bengals players
Salt Lake Stallions players